Le Châtelard VS railway station is a railway station in the municipality of Finhaut, in the Swiss canton of Valais. It is located on the  gauge Martigny–Châtelard line of Transports de Martigny et Régions. The station is adjacent to the valley station of the Funiculaire du Châtelard to Lac d'Émosson.

Services 
 the following services stop at Le Châtelard VS:

References

External links 
 
 

Railway stations in the canton of Valais
Transports de Martigny et Régions stations